George Flaggs Jr. (born March 20, 1953) is an American politician and the incumbent Mayor of Vicksburg, Mississippi. An independent, Flaggs won his first term as mayor in 2013 and was reelected in 2017. Flaggs was once again reelected in 2021.

Prior to becoming mayor, Flaggs was a member of the Mississippi House of Representatives from the 55th district from 1988 to 2013. He served in this capacity as a member of the Democratic Party. He was a youth court counselor in Warren County and a member of the Vicksburg Planning Commission and the Zoning Board of Appeals.

In 2014, Flaggs married Valencia Jones, an employee of the U.S. Army Corps of Engineers Engineer Research and Development Center, in a small ceremony at Triumph Church. He has two children from a prior marriage. In March 2018, Flaggs left the Democratic Party and became an Independent.

References

1953 births
21st-century American politicians
African-American mayors in Mississippi
African-American state legislators in Mississippi
Jackson State University alumni
Living people
Mayors of places in Mississippi
Members of the Mississippi House of Representatives
Mississippi Democrats
Mississippi Independents
People from Edwards, Mississippi
People from Vicksburg, Mississippi
21st-century African-American politicians
20th-century African-American people